Oh, My Mama! is a 2016 Philippine television drama series broadcast by GMA Network. The series is based on a 1981 Philippine film of the same title. Directed by Neal del Rosario, it stars Inah de Belen. It premiered on September 19, 2016 on the network's Afternoon Prime line up replacing Magkaibang Mundo. The series concluded on December 2, 2016 with a total of 55 episodes. It was replaced by Ika-6 na Utos in its timeslot.

The series is streaming online on YouTube.

Premise
Maricel finds out that the father she recognized isn't her biological father which will lead to her finding her biological father. She will later end up in a syndicate and stay to know her father. She will also know Peewee, Bayani, Bimbo, Berto and Nicole, kids who works for the syndicate in a sweatshop. Maricel and the kids will escape from the sweatshop and Maricel will serve as a mother figure to the kids.

Cast and characters

Lead cast
 Inah de Belen as Maricel "Mama Cel" Domingo Reyes

Supporting cast
 Epy Quizon as Gordon Domingo
 Jake Vargas as Julio Sta. Ana
 Jeric Gonzales as Zach Ynares
 Gladys Reyes as Inday Bartolome
 Ryan Eigenmann as Efren Ynares
 Yul Servo as Robert Reyes
 Sheree Bautista as Patricia Ynares
 Jenny Miller as Sabrina Cruz
 Arthur Solinap as Rick Rosales
 Eunice Lagusad as Sara Bartolome
 Ashley Ortega as Ariana Gutierrez
 Phytos Ramirez as Justin Gutierrez
 Teri Malvar as Peewee Reyes
 David Remo as Empoy Guevarra-Reyes
 Jhiz Deocareza as Bayani Salcedo
 Bryce Eusebio as Bimbo Domingo-Salcedo
 Sofia Pablo as Nicole Pangilinan

Guest cast
 Sheryl Cruz as Julia Domingo-Reyes
 Eva Darren as Loleng Sta. Maria
 Victor Harry as young Gordon
 Beatriz Imperial as young Julia
 Elle Ramirez as Linda
 Analyn Barro as Miley
 Gilleth Sandico as Maria Leonora 
 Luz Fernandez as Conchita
 Dang Cruz as Lourdes
 Shiela Marie Rodriguez as Carmi 
 Alchris Galura as Gary 
 Vince Gamad as Marvin
 Jenny Cruz as Lily  
 Jayzelle Suan as Aa

Episodes

September 2016

October 2016

November 2016

December 2016

Ratings
According to AGB Nielsen Philippines' Mega Manila household television ratings, the pilot episode of Oh, My Mama! earned a 13% rating. While the final episode also scored a 13% rating.

References

External links
 
 

2016 Philippine television series debuts
2016 Philippine television series endings
Filipino-language television shows
GMA Network drama series
Live action television shows based on films
Television shows set in Quezon City